The Disappearance of Aimee is a 1976 American made-for-television biographical drama film directed by Anthony Harvey and starring Faye Dunaway as the evangelist Aimee Semple McPherson, co-starring Bette Davis, James Sloyan and James Woods. The film originally premiered as a presentation of Hallmark Hall of Fame on NBC on November 17, 1976.

Plot
Based on true events, the film attempts to investigate the mysterious disappearance of Aimee Semple McPherson in 1926 and the court case that followed her safe return after she was missing for four weeks.

Cast
Faye Dunaway as Aimee Semple McPherson
Bette Davis as Minnie Kennedy
James Sloyan as District Attorney Asa Keyes
James Woods as Assistant District Attorney Joseph Ryan
John Lehne as Captain Cline
Lelia Goldoni as Emma Shaffer
Severn Darden as S.I. Gilbert
William Jordan as Kenneth Ormiston

Mention in Bette Davis Memoir
In her memoir This 'n That (1987, Berkley Pub Group), Bette Davis recounted several anecdotes about working on The Disappearance of Aimee. Among them was that her co-star, Faye Dunaway, was one of the most unprofessional people she had ever worked with. Davis stated that Dunaway would show up hours late, not knowing her lines, and being generally difficult. For one of the scenes in the un-air-conditioned tabernacle, over 1800 unpaid extras (locals who had been promised a box lunch and a chance to be in a movie) were left for hours awaiting Dunaway's arrival. When they finally began leaving, Davis rushed to the pulpit and began singing "I've Written a Letter to Daddy," a song from her wildly popular 1962 film What Ever Happened to Baby Jane?. Hearing her, many returned to their seats in the pews.

External links

1976 television films
1976 films
1970s biographical drama films
American biographical drama films
Drama films based on actual events
Aimee Semple McPherson
NBC network original films
Hallmark Hall of Fame episodes
Films directed by Anthony Harvey
1970s English-language films
1970s American films